The National Association for the Promotion of Social Science (NAPSS), often known as the Social Science Association, was a British reformist group founded in 1857 by Lord Brougham. It pursued issues in public health, industrial relations, penal reform, and female education. It was dissolved in 1886.

Background

The efforts of George Hastings brought together three groups of the 1850s to form the NAPSS: the Society for Promoting the Amendment of the Law, the National Reformatory Union, and the Society for Promoting the Employment of Women (the Langham Place Group). It took as model the British Association for the Advancement of Science, holding an itinerant annual meeting, which provided a forum for social reformers.

The objective of the Association was defined as "to coordinate the efforts of the experts and the politicians". One factor in the eventual decline of the NSPSS was that the objectives of medical reformers changed. Legislation and the efforts of central government to improve public health became less important to them.

Its first secretary was Isa Knox.

Congresses
Twenty-eight Social Science Congresses took place:

Committees

Trades Societies and Strikes
A committee of the Association produced Report on Trade Societies and Strikes (1860). This report was highly regarded: Sidney and Beatrice Webb later called it "the best collection of Trade Union material and the most impartial account of Trade Union action that has ever been issued". There were contributions by three Christian Socialists (Thomas Hughes, John Malcolm Forbes Ludlow, and F. D. Maurice). Hughes was one of two secretaries to the committee (with P. M. Rathbone). The committee included the Liberal politicians William Edward Forster, and Sir James Kay-Shuttleworth, 1st Baronet. There was one trade unionist as member, Thomas Joseph Dunning.

Quarantine Committee
The Association's Quarantine Committee was set up in 1858. Its report was published officially by Parliament.

Notes

Defunct organisations based in England
Social sciences organizations
Organizations established in 1857
Organizations disestablished in 1886
1857 establishments in the United Kingdom
1886 disestablishments in the United Kingdom
Learned societies of the United Kingdom
Medical and health organisations based in the United Kingdom